The Fomitopsidaceae are a family of fungi in the order Polyporales. Most species are parasitic on woody plants, and tend to cause brown rots. The name comes from Fomitopsis (meaning "looking like Fomes") + -aceae (a suffix used to form taxonomic family names).

Genera

In a proposed family-level classification of the Polyporales based on molecular phylogenetics, Alfredo Justo and colleagues accept 14 genera in the Fomitopsidaceae:
Anthoporia, Antrodia, Buglossoporus, Cartilosoma, Daedalea, Fomitopsis, Fragifomes, Melanoporia, Neolentiporus, Niveoporofomes, Rhodofomes, Rhodofomitopsis, Rubellofomes, and Ungulidaedalea.

References

External links

 
Fomitopsidaceae
Fungi described in 1982
Taxa named by Walter Jülich